Janq'u Llaqa (Aymara janq'u white, llaqa feather, "white feather", hispanicized spelling Ancollaca) is a mountain in the Andes of Peru, about  high. It is in the Moquegua Region, Mariscal Nieto Province, Carumas District. It is southwest of Jach'a K'uchu and north of Kuntur Nasa.

References

Mountains of Moquegua Region
Mountains of Peru